The 1842–43 United States Senate elections were held on various dates in various states. As these U.S. Senate elections were prior to the ratification of the Seventeenth Amendment in 1913, senators were chosen by state legislatures. Senators were elected over a wide range of time throughout 1842 and 1843, and a seat may have been filled months late or remained vacant due to legislative deadlock. In these elections, terms were up for the senators in Class 3.

The Whigs lost seats but maintained control of the Senate.  Although they lost three seats in the regular elections, they gained two of them back by the start of the first session in special elections.

Results summary 
Senate party division, 28th Congress (1843–1845)

 Majority party: Whig (27)
 Minority party: Democratic (22–23)
 Other parties: (0–1)
 Total seats: 52–54

Change in Senate composition

Before the elections 

After July 1842 appointment in New Jersey.

Result of the elections

Beginning of the next Congress

Beginning of the first session of the next Congress (December 4, 1843)

Race summaries 
Bold states link to specific election articles.

Special elections during the 27th Congress 
In these elections, the winners were elected during 1842 or in 1843 before March 4; ordered by election date.

Races leading to the 28th Congress 

In these regular elections, the winners were elected for the term beginning March 4, 1843; ordered by state.

All of the elections involved the Class 3 seats.

Elections during the 28th Congress 
In these special elections, the winners were elected in 1843 after March 4; ordered by election date.

Complete list of races

Maryland 

James Pearce won election by an unknown margin of votes, for the Class 3 seat.

New York 

The election was held February 7, 1843, by the New York State Legislature.  Silas Wright, Jr., had been elected in 1833 to this seat after the resignation of William L. Marcy, and had been re-elected in 1837. Wright's term would expire on March 3, 1843. At the State election in November 1842, Democrat William C. Bouck was elected Governor, 92 Democrats and 36 Whigs were elected to the Assembly, and 8 Democrats and 1 Whig were elected to the State Senate. The 66th New York State Legislature met from January 3 to April 18, 1843, at Albany, New York.  The incumbent U.S. Senator Silas Wright Jr. was re-nominated unanimously by a Democratic caucus on the eve of the election. Congressman Millard Fillmore was the candidate of the Whig Party. Silas Wright, Jr., was the choice of both the Assembly and the Senate, and was declared elected.

Wright continued in the U.S. Senate, and remained in office until November 1844 when he resigned after his election as Governor of New York. Henry A. Foster was appointed to fill the vacancy temporarily, but the State Legislature elected John A. Dix for the remainder of Wright's term.

Pennsylvania 

The election was held January 10, 1843. Future President of the United States James Buchanan was re-elected by the Pennsylvania General Assembly to the United States Senate. The Pennsylvania General Assembly, consisting of the House of Representatives and the Senate, convened on January 10, 1843, to elect a new Senator to fill the term beginning on March 4, 1843. Incumbent Democrat James Buchanan, who was elected in 1834 and re-elected in 1836, was a successful candidate for re-election to another term. The results of the vote of both houses combined are as follows:

 |-bgcolor="#EEEEEE"
 | colspan="3" align="right" | Totals
 | align="right" | 132
 | align="right" | 100.00%

|}

Tennessee 

In 1841, Spencer Jarnagin was nominated for U.S. Senator by the Whig caucus in the Tennessee General Assembly. However, some of the Democrats in the legislature decided that no Senator would be preferable to a Whig. Known as the "Immortal Thirteen" by Tennessee Democrats, they refused to allow a quorum on the issue. By the time Jarnagin was eventually elected to the seat and sworn in, over two and half years, almost half of the term, had elapsed. Jarnagin finally assumed office on October 17, 1843.

See also
 1842 United States elections
 1842–43 United States House of Representatives elections
 27th United States Congress
 28th United States Congress

References

 Party Division in the Senate, 1789-Present, via Senate.gov
The New York Civil List compiled in 1858 (see: pg. 63 for U.S. Senators; pg. 134 for State Senators 1843; pg. 227f for Members of Assembly 1843)
Members of the 28th United States Congress
Political History of the State of New York, from Jan. 1, 1841, to Jan. 1, 1847; Vol. III by Jabez Delano Hammond (State election, 1842: pg. 311f; U.S. Senate election, 1843: pg. 349)
Journal of the Assembly (66th Session) (1843; pg. 255f)
Pennsylvania Election Statistics: 1682-2006 from the Wilkes University Election Statistics Project